Abadiyeh is a place in Egypt situated about a dozen miles west of Dendera.

Archaeological
W. M. Flinders Petrie was assisted with excavations by David Randall-MacIver and Arthur Cruttenden Mace, these having been done on the behalf of the Egyptian Exploration Fund (EEF). The excavations, considered in totality, consisted of sites  along the west bank of the Nile in the Hiw region, found to contain artifacts of a Predynastic type. Prehistoric cemeteries were found at Abadiyas and Hu (Diospolis Parva).

Further reading
 Oxford University-School of Archaeology  from   Faculty of Oriental Studies-retrieved 17;59 30.9.11- both showing Rowland, J.M., (2007), Excavating the early cemeteries of Egypt: el Amrah, el Mahasna, Hu and Abadiyeh: in “The Egypt Exploration Society - The Early Years (ed., Spencer, P.)”, pp 168-197, The Egyptian Exploration Society, London.
  Egypt Exploration Fund-Archæological report ([1893-1912])  retrieved 18:21 30.9.11

References

External links
 Object found at cemetery, retrieved 21;21 30.9.11

Archaeological sites in Egypt
Archaeological discoveries with year of discovery missing